Max Sillig (19 November 1873 – 15 November 1959) was a Swiss ice hockey player and builder.

Career
Sillig was born in La Tour-de-Peilz, and played for the Switzerland men's national ice hockey team at the 1920 Summer Olympics in Antwerp. He played at RW position throughout his career. He is sometimes called as the "Father of Swiss Ice Hockey". In 1905, he founded Hockey Club, Bellerive that in 1907 and 1908 won the championship of Western Switzerland and in 1909 became the first Swiss Ice Hockey champion.

He was president of the International Ice Hockey Federation from 1920–1922. His successor was Paul Loicq. He died in Lausanne.

References

External links
 

1873 births
1959 deaths
Ice hockey players at the 1920 Summer Olympics
International Ice Hockey Federation executives
Olympic ice hockey players of Switzerland
People from Riviera-Pays-d'Enhaut District
Sportspeople from the canton of Vaud